Mom Soth is a Cambodian film actor who has appeared in three films, Rice People (1994), The Last Days of Colonel Savath (1995) and An Ambition Reduced to Ashes (1995).

Filmography

References

External links
 

Cambodian male film actors
Year of birth missing (living people)
Living people
20th-century Cambodian male actors